Aglaia subsessilis is a species of plant in the family Meliaceae. It is a tree endemic to Borneo.

References

subsessilis
Endemic flora of Borneo
Trees of Borneo
Vulnerable plants
Taxonomy articles created by Polbot
Flora of the Borneo lowland rain forests